Philippe Tanchon (born 23 January 1963) is a retired French bobsledder. He competed at the 1992 Winter Olympics and the 1994 Winter Olympics. At the 1992 Winter Olympics, Tanchon placed 17th in the two-men competition, and at the 1994 Winter Olympics, he placed 23rd in the two-men competition, and 16th in the four-men competition.

References

1963 births
Living people
French male bobsledders
Olympic bobsledders of France
Bobsledders at the 1992 Winter Olympics
Bobsledders at the 1994 Winter Olympics
People from Douai
Sportspeople from Nord (French department)